Bhandal Buta is a village in Jalandhar district of Punjab State, India. The village is administrated by a sarpanch, who is an elected representative of the village in line with the Panchayati raj.

Demography 
According to Census India, in 2011, Bhandal Buta had 147 houses and a population of 709 (339 males and 370 females). The literacy rate was 76.32%, higher than the state average of 75.84%. The number of children under the age of 6 years was 84 (11.85% of the population) and the child sex ratio was approximately 1211 as compared to Punjab state average of 846.

Most of the people were from schedule castes, which constituted 52.19% of the total population. The town did not have any schedule tribe population.

202 people were engaged in work activities (179 males and 23 females). 96.04% workers described their work as main work, and 3.96% workers were involved in marginal activities providing a livelihood for less than 6 months, none of whom were agricultural labourers.

Education 
The village has a co-educational primary school founded in 1976. It provides a mid-day meal under the Indian Midday Meal Scheme.

Transport

Rail 

Air 

References 

Villages in Jalandhar district
Villages in Phillaur tehsil